Velora is a genus of longhorn beetles of the subfamily Lamiinae.

Species 
Velora contains the following species:

 Velora alboplagiata (Aurivillius, 1927)
 Velora australis Thomson, 1864
 Velora ciliata Breuning, 1931
 Velora curvifascia (Aurivillius, 1927)
 Velora sordida (Pascoe, 1863)

References

Lamiinae